Pierre Nanterme (7 September 1959 – 31 January 2019) was a French business executive. He was the chairman and chief executive officer (CEO) of Accenture, a global management consulting and professional services firm.

Early life
Nanterme was born in France in 1959. He attended the ESSEC Business School (École Supérieure des Sciences Économiques et Commerciales) in Paris and received a master's in management degree in 1981. After graduation, he completed his military service in France.

Career at Accenture
In 1983, Nanterme began his career at the consulting firm Accenture (then known as Andersen Consulting). Roles during his early career at the company included acting as head of the banking and finance practice in France. He became a partner at the firm in 1993.  Between 1993 and 2005, Nanterme held a number of positions in the firm's financial services practice, including managing director for Europe, Africa, and Latin America, as well as global managing director of the insurance industry group.

In November 2005, Nanterme was appointed the national managing director for Accenture in France. The next year, he joined Accenture's global leadership team and became the company's chief leadership officer, managing its leadership development.

In 2007, Nanterme was appointed group chief executive of Accenture's global financial services operating group, which focuses on clients in banking, insurance, and capital markets. In October 2010, the company announced that Nanterme would serve as the next chief executive officer of Accenture, at which time he also became a member of the board of directors. He officially took office as CEO on 1 January 2011, and in February 2013 took on the additional role of chairman.

On 11 January 2019, Nanterme resigned as chairman and CEO, citing health concerns. He worked in Accenture for a total of 36 years.

Other professional roles and awards

Nanterme was involved with the Mouvement des Entreprises de France (MEDEF), the largest French employers' association, and served as president of the association's Commission for Economic Affairs and Public Finance from 2005 to 2013. He also served on MEDEF's executive board.

Between 2007 and 2011, Nanterme was chairman of the French consulting association SYNTEC, which has member companies from the engineering, information technology, research, and consulting sectors.

In 2010, Nanterme was awarded the insignia Chevalier of the Legion of Honour for his work as a French business leader.

Nanterme served on a number of task forces for the B20 Summit, and was a member of the executive board of the B20 Green Growth Action Alliance, which was launched by the World Economic Forum to work on the growing need for private funding in sustainability. He also co-chaired the Alliance's Energy Efficiency working group and served as a member of the Economic Policy working group.

In addition to the above roles, Nanterme served on the steering board of the European Commission's European Cloud Partnership, which aims to encourage the public sector to use cloud computing services to create economic growth in Europe. He also acted as a board member of the TransAtlantic Business Dialogue, a group of CEOs who form policies to encourage trade between Europe and America.

Health concerns and death

Nanterme was diagnosed with colon cancer in 2016. Twenty days after stepping down as CEO, on 31 January 2019, Nanterme died in Paris at the age of 59.

References

1959 births
2019 deaths
Accenture people
French chief executives
ESSEC Business School alumni
Businesspeople from Lyon
Chevaliers of the Légion d'honneur
Deaths from cancer in France
Deaths from colorectal cancer